MBCA may refer to:
 Manitoba Court of Appeal
 Migratory Birds Convention Act
 Model Business Corporation Act - A model set of law prepared by the Committee on Corporate Laws of the Section of Business Law of the American Bar Association
 MBCA Bank - A commercial bank in Zimbabwe